Cecilia Paulson is a Swedish Paralympic alpine skier. She represented Sweden in Paralympic Alpine skiing, at the 1994 Paralympic Winter Games, 1998 Paralympic Winter Games, and 2002 Paralympic Winter Games. She won four medals: two silvers and two bronzes.

Career 
She competed at the 1994 Winter Paralympics, in Lillehammer, with 1: 43.07 Paulson finished sixth in the super-G LWX-XII, behind Sarah Will in 1:26.67, Gerda Pamler in 1: 28.24, Stephanie Riche in 1: 37.99, Vreni Stoeckli in 1: 38.03 and Sandra Mittelholzer in 1:41.62. She competed in Women's Slalom LWX-XII, and Women's Giant Slalom LWX-XII, but did not finish.

At the 1998 Winter Paralympics, in Nagano, Paulson won two bronze medals: in the super-G race, with a realized time of 1:13.33 (gold for Sarah Will in 1: 09.49 and silver for Kuniko Obinata in 1: 11.24), and downhill LW10-11 in 1:31.29 (on the podium in front of her, Kuniko Obinata with 1:18.00 and Sarah Will in 1:19.02).

At the 2002 Winter Paralympics, in Salt Lake City, Paulson won two silver medals, slalom LW10-12, and giant slalom LW12. She placed 4th in super-G LW10-12, and downhill LW10-12.

References 

Living people
Year of birth missing (living people)
Sportspeople from Västerås
Paralympic alpine skiers of Sweden
Swedish female alpine skiers
Alpine skiers at the 1994 Winter Paralympics
Alpine skiers at the 1998 Winter Paralympics
Alpine skiers at the 2002 Winter Paralympics
Medalists at the 1998 Winter Paralympics
Medalists at the 2002 Winter Paralympics
Paralympic silver medalists for Sweden
Paralympic bronze medalists for Sweden